The 2005 Tennessee Titans season was the franchise’s 46th season overall, 36th with the National Football League and ninth in Tennessee. The team attempted to improve upon their previous output of 5–11, but was only able to win four games in 2005. The Titans’ games were often high-scoring, with eight of their sixteen games accumulating in excess of 50 points between the two teams.

This was Steve McNair’s final season as a Titan before getting traded to the Baltimore Ravens following the season.

Personnel

Staff

Roster

Schedule

Preseason

Regular season 
In addition to their regular games with AFC South rivals, the Titans played teams from the AFC North and NFC West as per the schedule rotation, and also played intraconference games against the Raiders and the Dolphins based on divisional positions from 2004.

Note: Divisional opponents are in bold text

Standings

Images

References 

2005
Tennessee Titans
Titans